The 2011 Charlotte Eagles season, is the club's 20th season in existence, and their eighth-consecutive year playing in the third division of American soccer. This year marks the club's debut in the newly created USL Pro League, an agglomeration of the defunct USL First and Second Divisions.

Review and events

Match results

Legend

USL Pro

U.S. Open Cup

Club

Roster 
As of June 2, 2011.

Management and staff 

  Pat Stewart - President
  Tom Engstrom - General Manager
  Mark Steffens - Head Coach
  Patrick Daka - Assistant Coach
  Kevin Sephton - Assistant Coach
  Steve Shak - Assistant Coach
  Ryan Souders - Goalkeeper Coach
  Allan Courtright - Director of Operations

League standings

American Division

Statistics 

* = Not currently part of team.

Transfers

In

Awards 
None.

See also 
 2011 USL Pro season
 2011 U.S. Open Cup
 2011 in American soccer
 Charlotte Eagles

References 

2011
American soccer clubs 2011 season
2011 USL Pro season
Charl North Carolina